Saurodactylus brosseti is a species of gecko in the Sphaerodactylidae family found in western Morocco. Both this species and Saurodactylus mauritanicus were both commonly known as the Morocco lizard-fingered gecko, and were both considered conspecific.
Its natural habitats are temperate forests, rocky areas, arable land, and pastureland.
It is threatened by habitat loss.

There may be four distinct lineages of Saurodactylus brosseti.

References

 Rosado, D., Rato, C., Salvi, D. et al. Evol Biol (2017) 44: 386. https://doi.org/10.1007/s11692-017-9417-8

Saurodactylus
Reptiles described in 1957
Taxonomy articles created by Polbot